Consorzio Trasporti Pubblici Insubria, better known as CTPI, is a mixed consortium society (Società consortile mista) of public transport that manages the urban and suburban transport of Varese,  Italy.

Bus companies of Italy